Masudi (also Romanized as Mas‘ūdī and Mas‘oodi) is a village in Arabkhaneh Rural District, Shusef District, Nehbandan County, South Khorasan Province, Iran. At the 2006 census, its population was 31, in 9 families.

References 

Populated places in Nehbandan County